Bryan David Dobson (born 10 February 1960) is an Irish journalist, newscaster and presenter with RTÉ in Ireland. He currently presents the RTÉ: News at One. He previously presented RTÉ News: Six One, RTÉ News: Nine O'Clock, most recently Morning Ireland, and occasionally RTÉ News: One O'Clock.

Early life
Dobson was raised in Sandymount. He attended Newpark Comprehensive School, Blackrock, Dublin. It was one of the first schools to introduce the Transition Year programme. In it, he presented a half-hour radio programme. When he finished school, he attended a media course in the Rathmines College of Commerce, Dublin Institute of Technology.

Broadcasting career

Early career
Dobson previously worked for the Dublin pirate station Radio Nova, hosting their nightly Dublin Today programme. Before joining RTÉ in 1987, he worked for BBC Northern Ireland.

RTÉ
Dobson joined RTÉ News and Current Affairs as a reporter in 1992. Before being the main RTÉ News: Nine O'Clock presenter, he was the RTÉ Business Correspondent. In September 1996, he was named as the co-presenter of the flagship early evening news programme, RTÉ News: Six One on RTÉ One, one of the most watched news programmes in Ireland. Since then he has presented that news programme, currently with Sharon Ní Bheoláin. He left his position as co-presenter on 25 October 2017 after 21 years to move to early morning radio on Morning Ireland.		

He also presents various special programmes such as RTÉ's coverage of general elections. In May 2011, he fronted RTÉ television coverage of Queen Elizabeth II's visit to the Republic of Ireland.

Controversy
In 2003, Dobson became embroiled in a minor controversy. Dobson was accused of a conflict of interest when it was reported that he had provided some training for senior local authority officials in answering questions in the media, although the controversy was somewhat defused when Dobson expressed regret for what was viewed as a misjudgment. He interviewed Bertie Ahern in 2006, after which Dobson said "I've never done an interview like it before and I doubt if I ever will again".
On 21 January 2013 an incident occurred when Dobson was interviewing the American White House press reporter Paul Brandus. At one point of the report, a man, though shadowed, appeared in front of the screen telling Brandus his time was over. The television facility was being shared and it was the next reporter's turn. Dobson commented: "Well in all my years on the jobs that's never happened, well there you go!"

Personal life
Dobson lives in Dublin with his wife and their two children.

References

1960 births
20th-century Irish people
21st-century Irish people
Living people
Alumni of Dublin Institute of Technology
Irish Anglicans
Irish radio presenters
Irish reporters and correspondents
RTÉ newsreaders and journalists
People from Sandymount